Rick ten Voorde (born 20 June 1991) is a Dutch former footballer who played as a forward.

Career

Emmen 
Ten Voorde was born in Emmen. In his first half-season as 17-year-old striker in the Dutch Jupiler League he scored 9 goals in 18 matches for FC Emmen and garnered an invitation for the Dutch under-19 football team and a transfer to Eredivisie-side NEC, while clubs like AZ Alkmaar, FC Twente, R.S.C. Anderlecht, Newcastle United, Vitesse Arnhem and sc Heerenveen were interested in the striker. He was also chosen as Dutch first division talent of the year 2009. On 19 February 2009, he signed a three-year deal at NEC until 2012.

NEC 
The new striker of NEC played well in the pre-season matches at his new club and scored his first goal for NEC against his former club Emmen. His good performances in preseason matches resulted in a call-up for the Netherlands U21 team as 18-year-old player. Ten Voorde is currently the youngest player of this team. On 21 November 2009, Ten Voorde made his official debut for NEC in an away match against NAC Breda, coming off the bench after 80 minutes and providing an assist. He made his first goal against ADO Den Haag after playing 45 minutes and being important in all the goals of the 2–3 away-win on 14 April 2010.

Return to Emmen 
On July 1, 2015 Rick ten Voorde signed a one-year contract with Emmen. He scored his first goal upon return against RKC Waalwijk on 9 November 2015.

Later career 
In August 2020, Ten Voorde signed with German Regionalliga West club SV Rödinghausen on a two-year contract.

Career statistics
As of 8 September 2010

Honours

Individual
 Bronze Bull (best talent) Eerste Divisie: 2009

NEC
 Trofeo Santa Cruz: Runner-up 2009
 Chippie Polar Cup: Runner-up 2010

References

External links
 Rick ten Voorde at Voetbal International 
 Rick ten Voorde at OnsOranje 
 
 Rick ten Voorde Interview 

1991 births
Living people
Footballers from Emmen, Netherlands
Dutch footballers
Dutch expatriate footballers
Netherlands youth international footballers
Netherlands under-21 international footballers
FC Emmen players
NEC Nijmegen players
RKC Waalwijk players
NAC Breda players
SC Paderborn 07 players
FC Dordrecht players
Almere City FC players
Hapoel Ramat Gan F.C. players
Knattspyrnufélagið Víkingur players
Þór Akureyri players
SV Rödinghausen players
Eredivisie players
Eerste Divisie players
2. Bundesliga players
Liga Leumit players
Úrvalsdeild karla (football) players
1. deild karla players
Regionalliga players
Expatriate footballers in Germany
Expatriate footballers in Israel
Expatriate footballers in Iceland
Dutch expatriate sportspeople in Germany
Dutch expatriate sportspeople in Israel
Dutch expatriate sportspeople in Iceland
Association football wingers
Association football forwards